Michael Bassey Esang (born 14 October 1987) is a Nigerian footballer. He played as a striker for Shillong Lajong FC in the I-League in India.

Notes

1987 births
Living people
Nigerian footballers
Shillong Lajong FC players
Nigerian expatriate sportspeople in India
Association football forwards
Expatriate footballers in India